Satan Returns is a 1996 Hong Kong horror film directed by Lam Wai-lun and starring Donnie Yen, Chingmy Yau, Kingdom Yuen, Francis Ng and Dayo Wong. The film was released in the United States as Shaolin vs. The Devil's Omen.

Plot
Ching, an officer in the Royal Hong Kong Police Force, has been experiencing the same nightmare where she sees a woman with her heart taken out and dies while being inverted on a cross. Later, during a hostage situation, Ching, who has never fired a gun before, manages to shoot the armed thug dead and rescue the hostage. When she moves closer to where the thug was taking cover earlier, she sees the horrible image that has been appearing in her nightmare: the dead body of a woman hanging on an inverted cross.

Ching's colleagues, Nam and Ka-ming, are put in charge of investigating this case. All the evidence from the crime scene – from symbols in the Book of Revelation written in blood on the woman's body to the inverted cross – suggests that the case is related to a Satanic cult. Nam and Ka-ming get Ching to help them with the case because she is knowledgeable about religious symbols.

Judas, Satan's messenger, is wandering around Hong Kong in search of his master's daughter, who is believed to be born on 6 June 1969. He is also responsible for committing the recent series of brutal murders. The police have sent three undercover policewomen as bait to lure Judas out, but their plan fails and one of the policewomen, Leon, is killed. While in a state of confusion, Ching has frequent visions of her long-lost father, who had abandoned her when she was still a child. Judas also contacts her and tells her that she is Satan's daughter, and that he will come to find her. Nam and Ka-ming are assigned to protect Ching, but they are still no match for Judas, who possesses supernatural powers.

In the early hours of 6 June 1996, Judas manages to break out of custody despite having been arrested earlier by the police. He kidnaps Ching and brings her to the rooftop of a high building, where he intends to carry out a ritual by taking out her heart. If she survives the process, then she is indeed Satan's daughter. Nam and Ka-ming come to save Ching and fight with Judas. Eventually, Nam manages to kill Judas by using a nail gun to impale him on the cross and setting him on fire, the burned cross which is inverted and fell from the building into the priest’s van as it got burned. Just as the clock strikes at 6 am, Ching tests out whether she is really Satan's daughter by taking out her heart. She survives and shows her heart to Ka-ming, who screams. The movie ends. While the flammed van set on fire at the end uses as background video, it says Revelation 20:7:8 before the ending credits

Cast
Donnie Yen as Nam
Chingmy Yau as Ching
Kingdom Yuen as Rose
Francis Ng as Judas
Dayo Wong as Ka-ming
Lam Sheung Yee as Priest
Lam Kwok-kit as Lulu's colleague
Ivy Leung as Leon
Lee Lik-chi as Peter 
Wayne Lai (cameo)
Cheung Lau as Lulu
Mandy Chan as Wife-beating policeman
Mak Wai-cheung as Suspect in restaurant
Tsim Siu-ling as Suspect in restaurant
Hon Ping as Policeman
Wong Shiu-keung
Bill Lui as Suspect in policeman

Reception

Critical
Love HK Film gave the film a negative review and writes "Satan Returns is plagued by the wacky, nonsensical Hong Kong ways which just don't work in pictures like these."

Box office
The film grossed HK$6,704,385 at the Hong Kong box office during its theatrical run from 17 May to 7 June 1996 in Hong Kong.

See also
Donnie Yen filmography
Wong Jing filmography

References

External links

Satan Returns at Hong Kong Cinemagic

1996 films
1996 horror films
1996 action thriller films
1996 crime thriller films
1996 martial arts films
1990s psychological thriller films
Hong Kong action horror films
Hong Kong action thriller films
Hong Kong crime thriller films
Hong Kong martial arts films
Hong Kong supernatural horror films
Supernatural action films
1990s supernatural thriller films
1990s action horror films
Crime horror films
Police detective films
Gun fu films
Hong Kong ghost films
Hong Kong serial killer films
Vampires in film
Films about Satanism
1990s Cantonese-language films
Films set in Hong Kong
Films shot in Hong Kong
Religious horror films
1990s Hong Kong films